Walid Sultan Midani (born April 3, 1983) is the founder and CEO of DigitalMania Studio, the first video game development studio in Tunisia.

Career
Walid gets his computer engineering degree from the private college of engineering and technology of Tunis (ESPRIT) in July 2008 and began his career in the field of video games.

In 2004, he co-founded startup Tunisia games that organised the Electronic Sports Tunisian Cup from 2005 to 2009. He also took part in the organisation board of the "Electronic Sports World Cup - ESWC" in Paris 2005 to 2007 and in California on 2008.

He launched the first video game studio in Tunisia: DigitalMania in 2011 of which he is the CEO.

In 2017, founded Yourun Ltd, video games and entertainment studio based in Malta. Their main title is Warshmallows a 2D arena shooter starring the Warshmallows, a tiny creatures with amazing powers. Yourun Ltd is also working on entertainment platforms mixing AI, blockchain and gamification.

He is also actually the co-founder of a Tunisian accelerator, Boost, and the co-director & co-founder of the Tunisian branch of the world's largest entrepreneur training and startup launch program, The Founder Institute.

References

Video game designers
Video game producers
1983 births
Living people